The Yareban or Musa River languages are a small family of Trans–New Guinea languages spoken near the Musa River in the "Bird's Tail" (southeastern peninsula) of New Guinea. They are classified within the Southeast Papuan branch of Trans–New Guinea.

Languages
The languages are,
Moikodi (Doriri)
Aneme Wake (Abia)
Barijian: Bariji, Nawaru (Sirio)
Yareba

Barijian is suggested by lexicostatistics in Dutton (1971).

The only pronouns which are known in enough languages to reconstruct are na 1sg and a 2sg, which are common to all Yareban languages.

Proto-language

Phonemes
Usher (2020) reconstructs the consonant inventory as follows:

{| 
| *m || *n ||  ||  || 
|-
| *pʰ || *tʰ || [*s] || *kʰ || *ʔ
|-
| *b || *d || [*dz] || [*g] || 
|-
| *w || *ɾ || *j ||  || 
|}
*s and *dz were acquired through loans, but may have already been present in the protolanguage. *ʔ and *g may have been allophones.

Vowels are *a *e *i *o *u.

Pronouns
Usher (2020) reconstructs the pronouns as:
{| 
! !!sg!!du!!pl
|-
!1excl
|rowspan=2|*na|| ||*ewa
|-
!1incl
|*uwa||*i[j]a
|-
!2
|*a|| ||*ja
|-
!3
|*dawa|| ||*ema(wa)
|}

Basic vocabulary
Some lexical reconstructions by Usher (2020) are:

{| class="wikitable sortable"
! gloss !! Proto-Musa River
|-
| head || *bo-tai
|-
| hair/feather || *idi
|-
| ear || *ome
|-
| eye || *nai-tai
|-
| nose || *iboʔo
|-
| tooth || *ni[ʔ]o
|-
| tongue || *meana
|-
| foot/leg || *buɾi
|-
| blood/salt || *iwa
|-
| bone || *tai
|-
| skin/bark || *ope
|-
| breast || *ama
|-
| louse || *uʔa
|-
| dog || *kua
|-
| pig || *boɾo
|-
| bird || *gasiɾa; *ada
|-
| egg || *baka; *uɾimi
|-
| tree || *ana
|-
| man/person || *e[ʔe]me
|-
| woman/wife || *aweta
|-
| sun || *eweaka
|-
| moon || *maɾabe; *sakaɾa
|-
| water || *adua
|-
| fire || *inaʔa
|-
| stone || *oma; *gebiɾo
|-
| path || *daʔaba
|-
| name || *ibi
|-
| eat/drink || *it-
|-
| one || *demu
|}

Evolution
Yareban reflexes of proto-Trans-New Guinea (pTNG) etyma are:

Yareba language:
ama ‘breast’ < *amu
 ‘cassowary’ < *ku(y)a
rarara ‘dry’ < *(ŋg,k)atata
baba ‘father’ < *mbapa
iji ‘hair’ < *iti[C]
ifu ‘name’ < *imbi
kofiti ‘head’ < *kV(mb,p)(i,u)tu
ogo ‘water’ < *ok[V]
eme ‘man’ < *ambi

Abia language:
amai ‘mother’ < *am(a,i)
sagai ‘sand’ < *sa(ŋg,k)asiŋ

References

External links 
 Timothy Usher, New Guinea World, Owen Stanley Range
 (ibid.) Proto–Musa River

 
Mailu–Yareban languages
Languages of Oro Province